New Sicily (NS) was a regionalist social-democratic political party based in Sicily. Its founder and leader was Bartolo Pellegrino.

It was composed mainly by former members of the regional section of the Italian Socialist Party and the Sicilian Action Party.

The party was affiliated to the House of Freedoms, the centre-right coalition led by Silvio Berlusconi. It participated in the national general election, obtaining 33,437 votes, and the Sicilian regional election of 2006, in a joint ticket with the Movement for Autonomy, obtaining 308,219 (12.5% of regional votes) and ten seats in the Sicilian Regional Assembly.

See also
Southern Italy autonomist movements

References

Defunct social democratic parties in Italy
Political parties in Sicily
Sicilian nationalist parties